Hamish Harding is a UAE-based British businessman, aviator, explorer, and space tourist. He is the founder of Action Group and chairman of Action Aviation, an international aircraft brokerage company with headquarters in Dubai, United Arab Emirates. Hamish Harding currently holds three Guinness World Records. On July 9–11, 2019, Capt. Harding served as mission director and crew pilot for the flight mission One More Orbit, which set the current world speed record for the fastest circumnavigation of Earth by aircraft over both geographic poles.

Early days
Hamish Harding is the Chairman of Action Aviation.  He has degrees in Natural Sciences and Chemical Engineering from the Cambridge University.  He also holds an Airline Transport Pilots License and business jet type ratings, including the Gulfstream G650, and is a skydiver.

Biography
In 2017, Harding worked with Antarctic VIP tourism company, White Desert, to introduce the first regular business jet service to Antarctic using a Gulfstream G550, landing on Wolfsfang Runway, a newly-created ice runway in Antarctica. Harding also visited the South Pole a number of times, accompanying Buzz Aldrin in 2016 as he became the oldest person ever to reach the South Pole (age 86).

In 2019, to celebrate the 50th anniversary of the Apollo 11 moon landing by Neil Armstrong and Buzz Aldrin, Harding, along with astronaut Col. Terry Virts, led a team of aviators that captured the Guinness World Record for circumnavigation of the earth via North and South Poles.  The record was achieved in a Gulfstream G650ER in 46 hours 40 minutes. On July 9–11, 2019, Hamish Harding together with a crew of eight astronauts and aviators broke the world speed record for the fastest circumnavigation via both poles in a Qatar executive Gulfstream G650ER ultra-long-range business jet. The Carbon-Negative flight mission One More Orbit launched and landed at the Shuttle Landing Facility (Space Florida) at NASA Kennedy Space Center, FL.USA. Capt. Harding served as the Mission Director and led an international team of over 100 people to gain the Guinness World Record for the fastest circumnavigation of the earth via both poles in 46h, 40min, and 22sec.

On March 5, 2021, Hamish Harding & Victor Vescovo dove to the deepest point of the Mariana Trench, the Challenger Deep, in a two-man submarine to the lowest point in the world's oceans to a depth of 36,000 ft. Here they set the World Record for greatest length covered at full ocean depth, and greatest time spent at full ocean depth.

This 13-hour underwater mission resulted in two Guinness World Records, the longest duration spent at Full Ocean Depth (4 hours 15 mins) and the longest distance traversed at Full Ocean Depth (4.6 km).

Hamish Harding holds three Guinness World Records
2019 - The fastest circumnavigation of the Earth via both poles.
2021 - Greatest Distance Covered At Full Ocean Depth. 
2021 - Greatest Duration Spent At Full Ocean Depth.

Space flight
Harding flew to space onboard New Shepard, as part of the Blue Origin NS-21 mission, on June 4, 2022. Harding was one of six astronauts to go to space on Blue Origin’s 5th human spaceflight aboard the New Shepard rocket.

Scientific Expedition
In September 2022, Harding, and his aviation company Action Aviation, supplied a specially customised Boeing 747-400 "Jumbo Jet" passenger aircraft to transport eight wild cheetahs from Namibia to India to launch the Reintroduction of the Cheetah to India project by the Indian Government and the Cheetah Conservation Fund in Namibia (CCF).  Cheetahs had been extinct in India since Independence in 1947 until the Prime Minister of India, Narendra Modi, released these cheetahs into the jungles of Kuno National Park in Madhya Pradesh on September 17, 2022.  The jet cabin was modified to allow cages to be secured in the main cabin of the Boeing 747 aircraft, allowing vets to have full access to the cats during the flight.

This important conservation project was designated a "Flagged Expedition" (Flag #118) by the Explorers Club with club members Harding and Laurie Marker, founder of the CCF, carrying the flag on the flight to India.

Awards and recognition
On August 27, 2022, Harding was inducted into the Living Legends of Aviation at the third Living Legends of Aviation Europe event held at Scalaria Hotel & Resort in Salzkammergut, Austria.
Harding is on the Board of Trustees of the Explorers Club and Chairman of the Middle East Chapter of the Explorers Club.  The Chairman of the Board of Trustees of the Explorers Club is Buzz Aldrin and its President is Jeff Bezos.

See also
 List of people who descended to Challenger Deep

References

Living people
British aviators
People who have flown in suborbital spaceflight
New Shepard passengers
1964 births